James Garfield Bizzle (March 9, 1920 – July 23, 1987) was an American baseball left fielder in the Negro leagues. He played with the Birmingham Black Barons in 1947.

References

External links
 and Seamheads

Birmingham Black Barons players
1920 births
1987 deaths
Baseball players from Arkansas
Baseball outfielders
20th-century African-American sportspeople